The Battle of Qinghe was a military conflict between the Jurchen Later Jin and Ming dynasty in the summer of 1618. The battle ended with the Jin conquest of Qinghe despite taking heavy casualties.

Background

The Jin army had conquered the fortress of Fushun and defeated a Ming army 10,000 strong. After resting for a month in Hetu Ala, Nurhaci set out again to take the fortress of Qinghe.

After the initial Jin attack on Fushun, the Ming court assigned the military commanders Li Rubai and Yanghao to Liaodong. The fortress of Qinghe was reinforced from several hundred men to a garrison force of 6,400. Yang Hao advised the commander of Qinghe, Zou Chuxian, to lay an ambush for the Jin in a nearby mountain pass with cannons. However Zou opted to stay in the fortress.

Course of battle

Nurhaci arrived at Qinghe and besieged it. The defenders fired cannons and hurled logs and boulders at the enemy. Despite sustaining heavy casualties, the Jin army was able to take the northwest corner of the wall before the defenders could reload their cannons. The battle continued within the city from street to street until the entire city was slaughtered. Zou died in combat.

The Jin army fanned out from Qinghe and took an additional 11 nearby towns, reaching as far as Shenyang. An advance force laid siege to Shenyang but was repulsed by Li Rubai and He Shixian, suffering 230 casualties.

Aftermath

Liu Ting arrived at Shanhai Pass, which marked the border between China proper and Liaodong. He immediately began training recruits from far off Sichuan, but stressed to the Ming court that he needed more time.

Ming's Ministry of Revenue raised taxes three-hundredths of a tael per mu to help fund training and supply costs for the Liaodong defense. The court also put a bounty of 10,000 taels on Nurhaci's head.

See also
Timeline of the Ming dynasty
Timeline of the Qing dynasty

References

Bibliography

Qinghe 1618
Qinghe 1618
Qinghe 1618
Military history of Liaoning